Kriminal is a 1966 superhero film directed and written by Umberto Lenzi. The film is about a thief and murderer called Kriminal (Glenn Saxson) who escapes from a prison and is chased after by Inspector Milton (Andrea Bosic). It was followed by a sequel, Il marchio di Kriminal ( The Mark of Kriminal).

Cast 
 Glenn Saxson as Kriminal
Andrea Bosic as Insp. Milton
Helga Liné as Inge - Trude
 as Lady Gold
Ivano Staccioli as Alex Lafont

Production
In August 1964, the fumetti neri series Kriminal began publication. The comics often contained themes of sex and violence, which included the title character seducing scantily-dressed women, then strangling or stabbing them to conceal his identity. Director Umberto Lenzi stated that he initially wanted to make a comic book-inspired film with an adaptation of Diabolik. Lenzi found himself unable to get the rights to Diabolik, which had purchased by Dino De Laurentiis. Lenzi then attempted an adaptation of Satanik, but eventually settled on Kriminal. Lenzi argued with Kriminal's creator Luciano Secchi about the changes he made with the character, which Lenzi would later describe as "a bit Nazi-skin fascist. We made a fun film." Lenzi opted for a lighter tone in contrast to the combination of sex and violence present in the fumetti.

The lead role was played by Dutch actor Roel Bos under the name "Glenn Saxson", who previously had leading roles in Spaghetti Westerns such as Go with God, Gringo. Bos did a screen test for Lenzi, who was looking to portray Kriminal as a younger character compared to his fumetti counterpart.

Shooting for the film lasted approximately two months. Interiors were shot in Rome, while exteriors were filmed in Madrid, Istanbul, The Black Sea and London. Most of the physical stunts in the film were performed by Bos' double Attilio Serverini, except for one of the more dangerous sequences involving Kriminal running atop a speeding train.

Release

Kriminal was released in 1966. The film was described by film historian Roberto Curti as being "moderately successful", which resulted in a sequel, Il marchio di Kriminal, directed by Fernando Cerchio, being released the following year. As of 2016, there has been no official English-language DVD of Kriminal.

Reception

In a retrospective review, Curti wrote that Kriminal is "fast, fun and entertaining overall, but it is also disappointingly tame." Curti mentioned that the film is "lacking the comic book's tongue-in-cheek attitude and political uncorrectness, while much of the film looked more like one of those travelogue James Bond rip-offs that were flooding the screens at the time."

Lenzi later noted that when he re-watched the film on television, that it "seemed even better than when I shot in 1966: then I was a bit perplexed, now I appreciate the aspect of irony in it, something which comic strips didn't have because they were vulgar, horrible."

See also
 List of Italian films of 1966
 List of Spanish films of 1966

References

Footnotes

Sources

External links

1966 films
Spanish superhero films
Films directed by Umberto Lenzi
1966 crime films
Films based on Italian comics
Live-action films based on comics
Films shot in Rome
Films shot in Istanbul
Films shot in London
Italian superhero films
1960s superhero films
Supervillain films
1960s Italian-language films
1960s Italian films